Alejandro "Álex" Díez Salomón (born 17 February 1996) is a Spanish professional footballer who plays as a right back for SD Ponferradina.

Club career
Díez was born in Cáceres, Extremadura, and represented Atlético Madrid and CD Leganés as a youth. In June 2015 he joined hometown club CP Cacereño, and made his senior debut on 30 August by playing eight minutes in a 1–0 Segunda División B home win against Pontevedra CF.

On 21 June 2016, after suffering relegation, Díez joined fellow third division side Mérida AD. The following 21 May, after featuring sparingly, he signed for Extremadura UD in the same category, achieving promotion to Segunda División at the end of the campaign.

Díez made his professional debut on 19 August 2018, starting in a 1–1 away draw against Real Oviedo. He scored his first professional goal on 16 November of the following year, netting the opener in a 2–0 home win against Deportivo de La Coruña, and was an ever-present figure during the season as his side suffered relegation.

On 10 August 2020, free agent Díez agreed to a three-year contract with UD Las Palmas still in the second division. He terminated his link with the club on 18 August 2022, and moved to fellow league team SD Ponferradina on 14 November.

References

External links

1996 births
Living people
People from Cáceres, Spain
Sportspeople from the Province of Cáceres
Spanish footballers
Footballers from Extremadura
Association football defenders
Segunda División players
Segunda División B players
CP Cacereño players
Mérida AD players
Extremadura UD footballers
UD Las Palmas players
SD Ponferradina players
Spain youth international footballers